Tomasi Cama (born 11 November 1980) is a New Zealand former rugby union player. He played for Manawatu in the Air New Zealand Cup, and the New Zealand Sevens team. Cama won the 2012 World Rugby Sevens Player of the Year Award.

He is the son of former Fiji sevens player Tomasi Cama.

Playing career

Cama started out in the Manawatu Colts in 2001 having a strong season and earning a spot in the Manawatu Development Squad in 2002. He played for the Manawatu Development Squad again in 2003. 2004 saw a change of colours when he wore the Wanganui colours in the NPC. After one season with Wanganui he went back to play for Manawatu. In 2006 Cama focused on his Air New Zealand Cup season for Manawatu and had a strong season.

In 2005 he was picked for the New Zealand Sevens team. Cama was back for the sevens, 2008 saw him selected once again for the sevens squad.
Tomasi signed up to play in the Sri Lankan Sevens Series Carlton Super Sevens. He played for the Uva Vipers in a two leg tournament across two weeks in mid May 2012.

In 2015 Cama retired from playing rugby.

Coaching 
Cama has taken up a job with the New Zealand Sevens programme as a scout to identify talent in both men's and women's teams. Cama is also the current coach of the Manawatu men's sevens team.

References

External links
 Sevens Profile
 
 NZ Sevens squad

1980 births
New Zealand rugby union coaches
New Zealand rugby union players
New Zealand people of I-Taukei Fijian descent
Commonwealth Games rugby sevens players of New Zealand
Manawatu rugby union players
Fijian emigrants to New Zealand
Living people
Commonwealth Games gold medallists for New Zealand
Rugby sevens players at the 2010 Commonwealth Games
New Zealand male rugby sevens players
Commonwealth Games medallists in rugby sevens
Medallists at the 2010 Commonwealth Games